Clark Jolley is an American Republican politician. He is a former Oklahoma State Senator, Oklahoma Secretary of Finance, Administration and Information Technology, and the former chairman of the Oklahoma Tax Commission.

Early life and career
Born in Oklahoma City, Oklahoma, Jolley graduated from Del City High School in 1988 and earned Music Education and Political Science degrees from Oklahoma Baptist University in Shawnee, Oklahoma in 1992. He received his Juris Doctor from the University of Oklahoma in 1995.

After graduating from the University of Oklahoma Jolley established a private law practice and went on to serve an administrative law judge for the Oklahoma Department of Labor. He was also a barrister member of the Robert J. Turner American Inn of Court.

Political career
Jolley was first elected to the Oklahoma Senate in 2004. District 41 then included large portions of Edmond, north Oklahoma City and southern Logan County. He was re-elected in 2008 and again in 2012. After the redistricting in 2011 (which Jolley co-chaired), District 41 included areas of Edmond, north Oklahoma City and Arcadia in Oklahoma County. Jolley was elected by his colleagues to serve as Republican Whip in 2007–2008 and then elected to the office of Assistant Majority Leader in 2009. He was re-elected to the Assistant Majority Leader position until he resigned in 2012, after he was appointed the Chairman of Appropriations. Jolley served the last five sessions as Chair of the Senate Appropriations Committee. In one of his last legislative acts, Jolley authored State Question 792, which was approved by the voters in November 2016 to modernize alcohol laws and place full-strength beer and wine in grocery stores.

In March 2017, he was nominated by Governor Mary Fallin and confirmed by the Oklahoma State Senate as an Oklahoma Tax Commissioner to fill a partial term created when former Commissioner Dawn Cash resigned to accept the position of First Assistant Attorney General under Oklahoma Attorney General Michael J. Hunter. Governor Kevin Stitt named Jolley as the chairman of the Tax Commission on April 15, 2021. On October 1, 2021, Jolley tendered his resignation as Chairman of the Oklahoma Tax Commission effective November 1, 2021. On November 20, 2021, Stitt named Oklahoma City accountant Mark Wood to succeed Jolley.

On February 28, 2018, Jolley was appointed to serve as the Oklahoma Secretary of Finance, Administration and Information Technology by Governor Mary Fallin.

He announced his candidacy for Oklahoma State Treasurer on November 9, 2021.

Personal life
Jolley and his wife have four children and reside in Edmond, Oklahoma. Jolley serves as an adjunct professor at both Oklahoma Christian University and Mid-America Christian University.

Election results

References

External links
 NewsOK Article published March 29, 2017
 Senator Jolley's Senate Website
 Clark Jolley's Campaign Website
 Oklahoma State Election Board, 2004
 Oklahoma State Election Board, 2008

1970 births
21st-century American politicians
Candidates in the 2014 United States elections
Candidates in the 2022 United States elections
Lawyers from Oklahoma City
Living people
Oklahoma Baptist University alumni
Oklahoma lawyers
Republican Party Oklahoma state senators
People from Del City, Oklahoma
Politicians from Oklahoma City
State cabinet secretaries of Oklahoma
University of Oklahoma alumni